Randall Edwards (born August 13, 1961) is an American politician who most recently served as the state treasurer of the state of Oregon.  A Democrat, Edwards was elected as treasurer in 2000, and reelected in 2004, after serving two terms in the Oregon Legislative Assembly.  He served as a manager and senior advisor at the state treasury from 1992–1996, and was an International Trade Analyst for the U.S. Commerce Department.

Early life and background

Childhood
Edwards was born in Eugene, Oregon, USA, but spent much of his childhood in Walla Walla, Washington, where his father, Tom Edwards, a history professor, took a position on the faculty of Whitman College and his mother continued her 20-year career as a public school teacher.

The young Edwards showed little interest in politics, and although described as bright and popular, but reserved, shunned the attention of involvement in student government.  He applied himself, instead, to his studies, and pursuit of competitive tennis, and mastery of classical cello. His father would later comment to the press that he had never imagined that his son would ever take to the rough and tumble world of politics. "Over the years, as a college professor, I tried to get people interested in politics, but they rejected it," said the retired professor, now living near his son in Portland. "What I didn't realize was that one of my own children would do what I was trying to get my students to do."

College
Edwards went on to Colorado College, graduating in 1983 with a bachelor's degree in economics, before joining U.S. Senator Bob Packwood's constituent services staff in Washington, D.C., and working on agricultural issues.  There, he met Julia Brim, a Packwood press aide, who would become his wife.

Edwards took a job at the Commerce Department, working on timber management policy, and attended George Washington University at night, earning an MBA in 1990.

Return to Oregon
In 1992, Edwards and his wife, moved to Portland, Oregon, her hometown, and where they still make their home with their three children. She continued to work on Senator Packwood's staff for one more year, then managed Craig Berkman's unsuccessful gubernatorial campaign. Edwards took a position on Oregon State Treasurer Jim Hill's staff.  Julia Brim-Edwards is a deputy director for state government and public affairs for Nike, Inc. and former Portland Public Schools co-chair.

Legislative career

1996 elections
Edwards' first elective office was as a member of the Oregon Legislative Assembly.  In 1996, he sought nomination to the open seat for the 15th District in the state House of Representatives.  The incumbent, Lisa Naito, had chosen not to seek reelection.  
He was challenged in the Democratic primary by Steve March, 49, a senior management auditor for Multnomah County and part-time college teacher, and Harry D. Ainsworth, 32, a lawyer.
Edwards secured the nomination with 2,587 votes to March's 2,245 and Ainsworth's 815, going on to face Republican Mark Lewis, 
whom he defeated 12,998 to 5,697.

First term in Oregon House
As a freshman legislator, Edwards introduced a 1997 bill empowering local governments to double traffic fines in school zones, and preventing judges from reducing the penalties.  Modeled after similar legislation applying to construction zones, the bill passed and was signed into law the same year.  
Bucking his own party's leadership and in a move opposed by then Democratic Governor John Kitzhaber, and drawing the ire of the Oregon Education Association, Edwards inserted a provision in a school funding bill which required audits of school districts' classification of students. Since state support doubles for students with disabilities, and includes extra funds for certain other types of students, the proposal was sought to insure such students were counted accurately.

Edwards regained the confidence of pro-education activists when he cast the sole dissenting vote in a 7-to-1 decision by the Revenue Committee to add U.S.$67 million in additional tax cuts to Measure 50, being referred to the voters in an election for which ballots had already gone out.  The referendum was intended to reverse even deeper cuts which had been enacted by Measure 47 the previous November.  The committee action was taken under threat by anti-tax activist Bill Sizemore to withdraw his support from Measure 50, which already granted $804 million in tax relief.  Sizemore said he was prepared kill the measure with a last minute advertising blitz, if the additional cuts were not approved.   Edwards objected on the grounds that any increase in Measure 50's cuts would require too great a curtailment of government services, especially in education.

By the end of his first legislative session, despite being not only a newcomer, but a member of the minority party, he had, in fact, gained a reputation as an effective pro-education politician, being described as a "virtual education bill machine."  But he not only wrote legislation, but managed to get much of it passed, making few, if any, long-term political enemies.  He was willing to take stands differing with fellow Portland Democrat Chris Beck on methods for funding the state park system, and by pushing for higher funding for education than was included in the Governor's proposed budget.  "I've made education my top issue in the session," Edwards said in an interview after the close of the session.  "It's the top issue in my district and the top issue in the state."

1998 reelection and second term
Randall ran unopposed in both the primary and general elections, and was reelected to a second term as state representative.  When the legislature convened the following year, the agenda already included a large number of education-related issues, many steeped in controversy.  Bills carried over, or already announced to be introduced included measures relating to charter schools, discipline, accountability for performance and class size, and spending on education was shaping up to be a big fight.

His committee assignments for the session included seats on both the Judiciary and Rules committees and membership on the Education subcommittee of Ways and Means.

Edwards co-sponsored a bill with State Senator Randy Miller (Republican-Lake Oswego) to put a cap on public school class sizes in kindergarten and primary grades (K-6),
after supporting a measure to expand the charter school program over his stated reservations that their existence was necessitated by a failure to provide adequate funding to public schools.

The legislature's work, of course, was not limited to education issues.  With Representative Jim Hill, (Republican-Hillsboro), Randall introduced a bill to require the Oregon Board of Medical Examiners to make a broad range of information about the state's physicians available online. Included would have been complaints filed against a doctor through a hospital peer review committee or internal review board, the Oregon Health Division or the state medical board, as well as pending malpractice claims.  
He also joined a bipartisan coalition of 17 Democrats and 11 Republicans in sponsoring a ballot referendum that would require a three-fifths majority vote to pass constitutional amendments by initiative.  The second-term legislator also sought to defuse a particularly controversial "defense of marriage" amendment to the state constitution then under consideration by offering an alternative measure which stripped from it language which also would have overturned an earlier court decision granting spousal benefits to same-sex partners of state employees.  His attempt at compromise failed, the original referendum passed, and was approved by voters the following year.

Tenure as State Treasurer

2000 elections
Edwards had his eye on the State Treasurer's post from the time he had worked as then Treasurer Jim Hill's legislative adviser from 1992 to 1996.  "When I worked in the treasurer's office, I thought that this could be a job I could do," Edwards told the Oregonian in 2001, "I was intrigued and impressed with what the job entailed."

In 2000, he got his chance, when Hill was prevented by law from running for a third term, and announced his candidacy for governor.  Edwards' colleagues in the Democratic party considered Edwards a clear favorite in the primary campaign, challenged only by Gary Bruebaker, a Deputy Treasurer with no prior political experience.  It turned out, however, to be a race that went down to the wire, remaining too close to call throughout election night, and automatically triggering a two-month-long hand recount.  Ultimately, Edwards prevailed, defeating Bruebaker by a mere 470 votes statewide, 152,071 to 151,601.

John Kvistad, a small-business owner from Tigard, who had been elected to three terms on the Metro governing council, was nominated Edwards' Republican opponent.  During the general election campaign, Edwards emphasizing his financial and legislative experience, stressing the importance of the State Treasurer's role in funding education. He presented a plan to create a $100 million capital bond fund for school construction projects.  Kvistad countered by pointing out Edwards' lack of experience outside of the public sector, and reminding voters of his own management background in both business and government.  He promised to improve the state's credit rating and implement a program to assist first-time home buyers. He was especially critical of Edwards' votes to increase the state's debt to fund schools.

The campaign became contentious, particularly between the two major party candidates, a prime example being a debate between the candidates which was the occasion for some sharp exchanges.  At the event, sponsored by the City Club of Portland, Edwards claimed his Republican challenger had "no plan" and was underqualified for the office.  Kvistad accused Edwards of exaggerating his financial experience, and attacked Edwards' school construction bond proposal, firing off the barb, "Instead of putting you in the state treasurer's office, maybe we need to put you in Consumer Credit Counseling Service."  Edwards responded that the treasurer had an obligation to address the issue of school financing as one of Oregon's most critical concerns. Looking Kvistad straight in the eye, he added, "You don't support helping our public schools."

The final result was a decisive win for Edwards in a race that had been joined by Constitution Party nominee Carlos Luceros, a computer software consultant who wanted to invest even more of the state's resources in education; Libertarian Mitchell T. Shults, an Intel executive who ran on a platform of reduced state spending, sale of state owned lands, and reform of the state employees' retirement system; and Leonard Zack of the Reform Party, a food service worker whose campaign centered on environmental issues.  Edwards received 705,273 votes, a majority of the 1,403,607 cast and 111,862 more than Kvistad, his nearest challenger at 593,411.

First term as treasurer
In a ceremony at the Gus Solomon Federal Courthouse in downtown Portland on January 1, 2001, Edwards, at age 39, was sworn in as the youngest State Treasurer to take office in Oregon in at least fifty years. 
The record of his predecessor in the office would be difficult to meet, let alone exceed. During Hill's two terms in office, the treasury's investments had increased in value by nearly 150 percent, and debt had been decreased 25 percent.  But change was on the horizon, and not for the better.  Edwards faced a host of difficult issues, including an economic slowdown well underway in the state, the potential downgrade of the state's credit rating, and serious reductions in federal contributions to the state's revenues.

By 2003, two years into his first term, as what the state's chief economist Tom Potiowsky described as a "jobless recovery" continued to drag on, Edwards was coping with announcements of staggering state budget shortfalls, forcing the legislature to make deep cuts in services, and increase both taxes and borrowing.

2004 reelection campaign
After the 2004 Democratic primary in which Edwards was unopposed, he won reelection to a second term over his three general election challengers: Republican Jeff Caton, Constitution Party nominee Carole D. Weingarden, and Libertarian Mitch Shults.  The final tally was Edwards, 889,974; Caton, 688,551; Shults, 52,819; and Weingarden, 49,875.

References

External links
Oregon State Treasury official state site
Oregon Blue Book - Earliest Authorities in Oregon 
Oregon Secretary of State - Oregon State Treasury Administrative Overview
Follow the Money - Randall Edwards 2004 campaign contributions
Project Vote Smart - Randall T. Edwards (OR) profile

1961 births
Living people
Colorado College alumni
George Washington University School of Business alumni
Members of the Oregon House of Representatives
State treasurers of Oregon
Politicians from Eugene, Oregon
Politicians from Walla Walla, Washington
Politicians from Portland, Oregon